Meryl McMaster (born 1988, Ottawa, Ontario) is a Canadian and Plains Cree photographer whose best-known work explores her Indigenous heritage. Based in Ottawa, McMaster frequently practices self-portraiture and portraiture to explore themes of First Nations peoples and cultural identity, and incorporates elements of performance and installation to preserve her mixed heritage and sites of cultural history in the Canadian landscape.

Work
In her work, McMaster explores "tensions surrounding understanding one's personal identity and heritage, especially her own as a woman of Indigenous (Plains Cree) and European (British/Dutch) descent". She adopts a performative approach in which she blurs the boundaries between performance, sculpture, and photography by incorporating elaborate costumes and props in order to create staged images. McMaster considers these elements to be tools of personal transformation that become extensions of her body. McMaster's first major series, Ancestral from 2008, "appropriates ethnographic portraits, which she then projects onto her photographic subjects: herself and her father," noted artist and curator Gerald McMaster.

She makes use of such elaborate props in works such as Winged Callings (animal costumes) or Aphoristic Currents (collar "fashioned out of hundreds of twisted newspapers") in order to examine the tensions between cultural and personal memory as well as how they interact with imagination. Both works are part of her In-Between Worlds series (2010–2013). With regards to her artistic practice, McMaster states: "I'm really interested in exploring questions of our sense of self and how we really come to construct that sense of self through land and lineage, history and culture". She continues to examine identity, colonialism, and the environment in her large-scale works.

Awards
McMaster studied photography at the Ontario College of Art and Design University, graduating in 2010. The same year, she won the Canon Canada Prize, the Ontario College of Art and Design Medal in Photography as well as the Spoke Club Membership Prize and the Vistek Photography Award. In 2013 she was a recipient of the Eiteljorg Contemporary Art Fellowship and, in 2016, she was longlisted for the Sobey Art Award.  In 2017, she was awarded the REVEAL Indigenous Art Award. In 2018, she was one of the three winners of the Scotia Bank New Generation Photography Award Other distinctions she received include the Charles Pachter Prize for Emerging Artists,  and the Doris McCarthy Scholarship. In March 2018, she was named one of three inaugural winners of the New Generation Photography Award, which supports the careers of young artists working in lens-based media.

Exhibitions
McMaster's first solo exhibition, In-Between Worlds, opened at Project Space, Harbourfront Centre, in 2010 before traveling to the Station Gallery, the Peterborough Art Gallery, the Art Gallery of Hamilton's Design Annex, and the Montreal Museum of Fine Arts until 2017. By 2015, McMaster had exhibited in more than forty group shows in Canada, the United States, and Italy. A survey of her work was organized by the Carleton University Art Gallery (CUAG) and curated by Heather Anderson. The exhibition was on view at CUAG from May 2 - August 28, 2016 and subsequently travelled to other venues including the Doris McCarthy Gallery, the Richmond Art Gallery (RAG), the Thunder Bay Art Gallery, the Art Gallery of Southwestern Manitoba, the Lethbridge University Art Gallery, and The Rooms.  Her work was prominently featured in Every. Now. Then: Reframing Nationhood at the Art Gallery of Ontario during the summer of 2017.

Group exhibitions 
Native Portraiture: Power and Perception, Tacoma Art Museum, February 10, 2018- February 10, 2019
Niigaanikwewag, Art Gallery of Mississauga, February 22 - April 15, 2018
 Recover All That Is Ours, Campbell River Art Gallery, March 1 - April 25, 2018
 ÀDISÒKÀMAGAN/NOUS CONNAÎTRE UN PEU NOUS-MÊMES/ WE’LL ALL BECOME STORIES, Ottawa Art Gallery, April 28 - September 16, 2018
Embodiment, Museum London, December 23, 2017 - April 1, 2018
New Generation Photography Award Exhibition, National Gallery of Canada and Onsite Gallery, 2018
Every. Now. Then: Reframing Nationhood, Art Gallery of Ontario, summer 2017
The Sublunary World, Baldwin Gallery, 2017
My Spirit Is Strong, Indigenous and Northern Affairs Canada Art Gallery, 2016
Back Where They Came From, Sherry Leedy Contemporary Art, 2016
Fifth World, Mendel Art Gallery, 2015
 Identity (Material Self: Performing the Other Within), MOCCA Toronto, part of CONTACT Photography Festival, 2014
In the Flesh, Ottawa Art Gallery, 2013
1812–2012: A Contemporary Perspective, Harbourfront Centre, 2012

Solo exhibitions 
 Confluence, University of Lethbridge Art Gallery, January 18 - March 15, 2018 [touring exhibition] 
 In Between Worlds, Montreal Museum of Fine Arts, September 8 - December 3, 2017 [touring exhibition]
 The Fifth World, Mendel Art Gallery, April 3 - June 7, 2015
 Second Self, Latcham Gallery, 2011

Collections
McMaster's work has been acquired by various public collections within Canada and the United States, including the Canadian Museum of History, the Art Gallery of Ontario, the Canada Council Art Bank, the Eiteljorg Museum, the National Museum of the American Indian, the Ottawa Art Gallery, the Nelson-Atkins Museum of Art and the Art Gallery of Greater Victoria as well as by Indigenous and Northern Affairs Canada.

Further reading 
 Burant, Jim. Ottawa Art & Artists: An Illustrated History. Toronto: Art Canada Institute, 2022. 
 Walker, Ellyn, The Fifth World, RACAR: revue d'art canadienne / Canadian Art Review Vol. 42, No. 2, Continuities Between Eras Indigenous Art Histories / Continuité entre les époques Histoires des arts autochtones (2017), pp. 124–126.
 Jurjans, Katrina, "ʻMaterial Self: Performing the Other Withinʼ Speaks of the Liminal Space Between Physical, Mental, and Cultural States", Opus Magazine
 Meryl McMaster: Confluence, exhibition catalogue with essays by Heather Anderson, Gabrielle Moser, and cheyanne turions, (Ottawa: Carleton University Art Gallery, 2016) , 9780770905958
 Every. Now. Then. Reframing Nationhood,  exhibition catalogue edited by Andrew Hunter, Toronto: Art Gallery of Ontario, 2017. 
Manon Gaudet, "Crossovers: Meryl McMaster", Border Crossings, 141, vol. 36, no. 1 (March 2017).

aRberg, "And the firsteferences 

OCAD University alumni
1988 births
21st-century Canadian women artists
Artists from Ottawa
Canadian women photographers
Cree people
First Nations photographers
Living people
21st-century women photographers
First Nations women artists